Dinsmore House may refer to:

Dinsmore Homestead, Burlington, Kentucky, listed on the National Register of Historic Places as Dinsmore House and as James Dinsmore House, in Boone County, Kentucky
Dinsmore House (Carlisle, Kentucky), listed on the National Register of Historic Places in Nicholas County, Kentucky